is a Japanese voice actor and narrator. He is known for dubbing over Sylvester Stallone, Roy Scheider and Dean Martin.

Filmography

Television animation
Astro Boy (1963) (Kinoo (ep. 33), Brutus (ep. 40), Nuwu (ep. 48))
Star of the Giants (1968) (Jōji Hayami)
Anne of Green Gables (1979) (Narrator)
Game Center Arashi (1982) (Burashi Ishino)
The Super Dimension Fortress Macross (1982) (Bruno J. Global)
Nadia: The Secret of Blue Water (1990) (Narrator)
Master Keaton (1998) (Lord Fenders)
Monster (2004) (Hans Georg Schubert)
Tokimeki Memorial Only Love (2007) (Board Chairman Retsuyama Baku)
Ultraviolet: Code 044 (2008) (King)
Sword Art Online (2013) (Old man/Kraken)
Waka Okami wa Shogakusei! (2018) (Yoshiharu Inada (ep. 9))
Gibiate (2020) (Yukinojyo Onikura)

OVA
Legend of the Galactic Heroes (1989) (Walter von Schenkopp)
Giant Robo (1992) (The Dazzling Cervantes)
Green Legend Ran (1992) (Jeke)
Spirit of Wonder (1992) (Dr. Breckenridge)
Black Jack (1993) (Police Inspector Takasugi)

Theatrical animation
Ganbare!! Tabuchi-kun!! (1979) (Tatsuro Hirooka)
Be Forever Yamato (1980) (Narrator)
The Super Dimension Fortress Macross: Do You Remember Love? (1984) (Bruno J. Global)
The Dagger of Kamui (1985) (Taroza)
Memories (1995) (Nirasaki)
Crayon Shin-chan: The Storm Called: The Battle of the Warring States (2002) (Yasutsuna)
Summer Days with Coo (2007) (The Samurai, Shimizu)
Space Battleship Yamato: Resurrection (2009) (Narrator)
Pop in Q (2016)

Video games
Sakura Wars 2: Thou Shalt Not Die (1998) (Kazuyoshi Yamaguchi)
Super Robot Wars Alpha (2000) (Bruno J. Global, The Dazzling Cervantes)
Another Century's Episode 2 (2006) (Bruno J. Global)
White Knight Chronicles (2008) (King Valtos)
Detective Pikachu (2016) (Ethan Graham)
Lego Dimensions (2016) (Gandalf the Grey)
Nioh 2 (2020) (Sen no Rikyū)

Live-action film
Sono Koe no Anata e (2022) (Himself)

Dubbing roles

Live-action
Dean Martin
Money from Home (Herman "Honey Talk" Nelson)
The Young Lions (Michael Whiteacre)
Rio Bravo (1969 and 1973 TV Asahi editions) (Dude)
Ocean's 11 (1967 and 1972 TV Asahi editions) (Sam Harmon)
Sergeants 3 (Sergeant Chip Deal)
4 for Texas (Joe Jarrett)
Robin and the 7 Hoods (Little John)
What a Way to Go! (Leonard 'Lennie' Crawley)
Marriage on the Rocks (Ernie Brewer)
The Sons of Katie Elder (Tom Elder)
Texas Across the River (1973 TV Asahi edition) (Sam Hollis)
Rough Night in Jericho (Alex Flood)
Bandolero! (Dee Bishop)
Airport (1973 NTV and 1981 TV Asahi editions) (Vernon Demerest)
The Cannonball Run (1984 Fuji TV and 1987 TV Asahi editions) (Jamie Blake)
Cannonball Run II (Jamie Blake)
Roy Scheider
The French Connection (Det. Buddy 'Cloudy' Russo)
The Seven-Ups (Buddy)
Jaws (2004 TV Tokyo edition) (Brody)
Marathon Man (Henry "Doc" Levy)
Sorcerer (Jackie Scanlon - 'Juan Dominguez')
Jaws 2 (2022 BS Tokyo edition) (Chief Martin Brody)
All That Jazz (Joseph "Joe" Gideon)
Still of the Night (Dr. Sam Rice)
Blue Thunder (1986 Fuji TV and 1988 TV Asahi editions) (Officer Frank Murphy)
2010: The Year We Make Contact (1988 TV Asahi edition) (Dr. Heywood R. Floyd)
52 Pick-Up (Harry Mitchell)
Night Game (Mike Seaver)
Cohen and Tate (Cohen)
Wild Justice (Peter Stride)
Sylvester Stallone
Rocky (Rocky Balboa)
F.I.S.T. (Johnny Kovak)
Rocky II (Rocky Balboa)
First Blood (1990 TBS edition) (John Rambo)
Rocky III (1987 TBS edition) (Rocky Balboa)
Rambo: First Blood Part II (1990 TBS edition) (John Rambo)
Rocky IV (1989 TBS edition) (Rocky Balboa)
Cobra (1988 TBS edition) (Lieutenant Marion 'Cobra' Cobretti)
Over the Top (1991 TBS edition) (Lincoln Hawk)
Rocky V (1994 NTV edition) (Rocky Balboa)
Oscar (Angelo "Snaps" Provolone)
Stop! Or My Mom Will Shoot (Sgt. Joseph Andrew 'Joe' Bomowski)
Rocky Balboa (Rocky Balboa)
Creed (Rocky Balboa)
Creed II (Rocky Balboa)
Michael Caine
Funeral in Berlin (1972 TV Tokyo edition) (Harry Palmer)
Hurry Sundown (Henry Warren)
The Italian Job (Charlie Croker)
Sleuth (Milo Tindle)
The Marseille Contract (John Deray)
The Man Who Would Be King (Peachy Carnehan)
Dressed to Kill (1991 TV Asahi edition) (Dr. Robert Elliott/Bobbi)
The Island (1988 TV Asahi edition) (Blair Maynard)
Hannah and Her Sisters (Elliot)
Jaws: The Revenge (1991 TV Asahi edition) (Hoagie Newcombe)
Miss Congeniality (2005 NTV edition) (Victor Melling)
Steve Martin
Three Amigos (Lucky Day)
Parenthood (Gil Buckman)
Grand Canyon (Davis)
Housesitter (Newton Davis)
Father of the Bride Part II (George Banks)
The Out-of-Towners (Henry Clark)
The Pink Panther (Inspector Jacques Clouseau)
The Pink Panther 2 (Inspector Jacques Clouseau)
Only Murders in the Building (Charles-Haden Savage)
Peter Sellers
Lolita (Clare Quilty)
After the Fox (Aldo Vanucci / Federico Fabrizi)
The Return of the Pink Panther (Inspector Jacques Clouseau)
Murder by Death (1981 TBS edition) (Inspector Sidney Wang)
The Pink Panther Strikes Again (Inspector Jacques Clouseau)
Revenge of the Pink Panther (Inspector Jacques Clouseau)
The Fiendish Plot of Dr. Fu Manchu (Fu Manchu / Nayland Smith)
Al Pacino
Sea of Love (Detective Frank Keller)
Dick Tracy (Alphonse "Big Boy" Caprice)
Looking for Richard (Richard III)
Ocean's Thirteen (2010 Fuji TV edition) (Willy Bank)
Danny Collins (Danny Collins)
Ian McKellen
The Hobbit: An Unexpected Journey (Gandalf the Grey)
The Hobbit: The Desolation of Smaug (Gandalf the Grey)
The Hobbit: The Battle of the Five Armies (Gandalf the Grey)
All Is True (Earl of Southampton)
The Absent-Minded Professor (Professor Ned Brainard (Fred MacMurray))
Alias (Arvin Sloane (Ron Rifkin))
Amadeus (Count Orsini-Rosenberg (Charles Kay))
The A-Team (John "Hannibal" Smith (George Peppard))
The A-Team (film) (General Russell Morrison (Gerald McRaney))
Bad Boys (1999 Fuji TV edition) (Captain Conrad Howard (Joe Pantoliano))
Batman Returns (1994 TV Asahi edition) (The Mayor (Michael Murphy))
Beethoven (George Newton (Charles Grodin))
The Best Exotic Marigold Hotel (Sir Graham Dashwood (Tom Wilkinson))
Better Call Saul (Charles "Chuck" McGill (Michael McKean))
Beverly Hills Cop III (Detective Jon Flint (Héctor Elizondo))
The Big Lebowski (VHS/DVD edition) (Jackie Treehorn (Ben Gazzara))
Combat! (PFC William G. Kirby (Jack Hogan))
Das Boot (Kapitänleutnant (Jürgen Prochnow))
Die Hard with a Vengeance (1998 Fuji TV edition) (Simon Peter Gruber (Jeremy Irons))
El Dorado (Sheriff J.P. Harrah (Robert Mitchum))
Emmanuelle (1979 TV Tokyo edition) (Jean (Daniel Sarky))
Escape to Athena (1982 TBS edition) (Charlie (Elliott Gould))
Flubber (Chester Hoenicker (Raymond J. Barry))
Golden Rendezvous (1979 TV Tokyo edition) (John Carter (Richard Harris))
Hard Target (1997 Fuji TV edition) (Elijah Roper (Willie C. Carpenter))
House of Cards (Raymond Tusk (Gerald McRaney))
Indiana Jones and the Temple of Doom (Chattar Lal (Roshan Seth))
Journey to the West: Conquering the Demons (Almighty Foot (Zhang Chao Li))
Last Vegas (Patrick "Paddy" Connors (Robert De Niro))
Never Say Never Again (1985 Fuji TV edition) (M (Edward Fox))
The Meyerowitz Stories (Harold Meyerowitz (Dustin Hoffman))
Mission: Impossible (1999 Fuji TV edition) (Jim Phelps (Jon Voight))
Murphy Brown (Jim Dial (Charles Kimbrough))
National Lampoon's Christmas Vacation (Clark Griswold (Chevy Chase))
Pork Chop Hill (1972 TV Asahi edition) (Private Forstman (Harry Guardino))
Project ALF (Colonel Gilbert Milfoil (Martin Sheen))
Race with the Devil (Frank Stewart (Warren Oates))
Screamers (2000 Fuji TV edition) (Commander Joseph A. Hendricksson (Peter Weller))
Sledge Hammer! (Sledge Hammer (David Rasche))
Somewhere in Time (2021 BS Tokyo edition) (William Fawcett Robinson (Christopher Plummer))
Spaceballs (President Skroob / Yogurt (Mel Brooks))
Speed (1997 Fuji TV edition) (Detective Harry Temple (Jeff Daniels))
Star Trek series (Q (John de Lancie))
Star Wars: Episode II – Attack of the Clones (Count Dooku (Christopher Lee))
Star Wars: Episode III – Revenge of the Sith (Count Dooku (Christopher Lee))
Teenage Mutant Ninja Turtles II: The Secret of the Ooze (Splinter)
Ted (Sam J. Jones)
Ted 2 (Sam J. Jones)
Tomorrow Never Dies (2002 TV Asahi edition) (Elliot Carver (Jonathan Pryce))
True Lies (1996 Fuji TV edition) (Albert Mike Gibson (Tom Arnold))
The Untouchables (Agt. William Youngfellow (Abel Fernandez))
Wanted (2019 BS Japan edition) (Pekwarsky (Terence Stamp))

Animation
Balto (Boris)
Fantasia 2000 (Steve Martin)
Fun and Fancy Free (Edgar Bergen)
Kubo and the Two Strings (Raiden the Moon King)
The Lego Movie (Vitruvius, Gandalf, Pa Cop)
Space Ghost (Space Ghost)
Star Trek: Lower Decks (Q)
Star Wars: Clone Wars (Count Dooku)
Star Wars: The Clone Wars (TV series) (Count Dooku)
Star Wars: The Clone Wars (Count Dooku)
SWAT Kats: The Radical Squadron (Commander Ulysses Feral)
The Plastic Man Comedy/Adventure Show (Plastic Man)

Awards

References

External links
 
 

1933 births
Japanese male voice actors
Male voice actors from Tokyo
Living people